Norinskaya is a rural locality (a village) in Konoshsky District, Arkhangelsk Oblast, Russia. The population was 7 as of 2010.

Geography 
Norinskaya is located 23 km east of Konosha (the district's administrative centre) by road. Lychnoye is the nearest rural locality.

References 

Rural localities in Konoshsky District